Camptoloma tigrinus is a moth of the family Noctuidae first described by George Hampson in 1894. It is found in India (Assam) and Myanmar.

References

Noctuidae
Moths described in 1894
Moths of Asia
Fauna of Assam